Sri Sarabha Sastri (1872–1904) was an Indian venu flute player, known as the first great Brahmin flutist. He brought the flute to the mainstream Indian Carnatic concert stage – until then, it was almost exclusively a folk instrument. To Sastri goes the credit of promoting the flute to the status of a primary concert instrument from being a mere 'second fiddle' to dance.

Early life and background 
Sri Sarabha Sastrigal was born in 1872 to Viswanatha Sastri and Smt. Dharmambal. His mother's native place was Tiruvadi and She lived next door to Saint Tyagaraja. His father died when he and his brother (Rao Sahib)Sivakumara Sastri were very young. Blind at a young age, he was initiated into a career in music under the guidance of his maternal uncle Sri Kuppusamy Sastri of  Tiruvadi near Thiruvaiyaru and later by Manambuchavadi Venkatasubbayyar, one of the leading disciples of Saint Tyagaraja. Sri Govinda Nayanakkar unravelled the mysteries of flute to young Sarabha Sastri. 
Sri Saraba Saastri lived in Soliappa Mudali street in Kumbakonam and was married to Ambu Ammal.

Penance at Eraharam 
Sastri undertook penance in ErAharam -Sri Sankari Samedha Skandanadha Swamy temple, obtained divinity and brought peace and happiness to local population. Later, he organised "Sarba Kavadi", " Macha Kavadi" etc. and spread the fame of this temple. Carrying kavadi is a practice of penance or prayaschittam. Thaipusam is a festival that is marked by acts of penance such as carrying the Kavadi. The Kavadi itself is a physical burden through which the devotees implore for help from deity.

Achievements 
Blindness in childhood could do nothing to blunt the musical genius of Sarabha Sastri. By experimenting with the flute, he evolved a fingering technique by which he could produce the entire range of Indian ragas on it.

Sri Sarabha Sastrigal composed more than 500 Sahityas for Nayanmar charithrams, in various languages.

Sri Saraba Saastrigal taught a unique technique in playing the Flute (with Tu-Tu kaarams). He was also able to play the Thaanam on the Flute. Sri Saraba Saastrigal was also called "Eka Chandra Graahi", since he had the uncanny ability to grasp anything by just listening once. Palladam Sanjiva Rao was a direct disciple of Sri Saraba Saastrigal. Palladam Sanjiva Rao passed this on to H Ramachandra Shastry who taught Carnatic flute at Kalakshetra until 1992. Some of the notable musicians practising this art form include G. S. Rajan, Ludwig Pesch and T. Sashidhar.

Sastri was always sought after by fans, but he never practised the flute at home. Sastri who never practised would however warm up within a few seconds from the commencement of a concert and readily get into his stride. He was a confirmed believer in emotional purification through music. He was invited to serve as the "Asthana Vidwan' of Mysore samasthan by the erstwhile Maharaja of Mysore which was refused by Sastri.He was also against commercialisation of music.

Origin of the Carnatic Flute 
Until the late 19th century, the Carnatic flute (better known in Tamil as the pullanguzhal), an 8-hole bamboo flute, the South Indian equivalent of the North Indian 6-hole bansuri flute, had never been used in Carnatic concerts. Sharaba Shastri has been characterised by his followers as a musical genius after experimenting and creating the Carnatic flute. He is also known for bringing the Carnatic flute to the fore of Carnatic music concerts as an influential instrument.
The Sharaba Shastri style or bani of playing was established and was carried on by his disciple Sanjeeva Rao. However it was the self-taught "Mali" who brought a revolution in popularising the Carnatic flute and whose legacy was carried on by Ramani and other national and international disciples of Mali.

The fingering technique invented by Sarabha Shastri was as highly scientific, and as accurate as a keyboard. The minutest oscillations required for the intricate gamakas of Carnatic music were covered by this fingering system. By progressing from playing only simple tunes to the ability of producing full-fledged kritis complete with the nuances of every raga, the flute came on par with the veena as a concert instrument. No recordings of his playing survive, and apart from stray references in larger works, little has been written about his music. We only know his music through his student, the legendary Palladam Sanjiva Rao.

Sanskrit Scholar 
Sastri was a great scholar and used to have discussions with other scholars such as Thirupalanam Panchapakesa Sastrigal, Sulamangalam Vaidyanatha Bhagavathar and others. Music scholars such as Thirukodikaval Krishna Iyer, “Fiddle” Govindasamy Pillai, Pattanam Subramaniya Iyer, Thanjavur Krishna Bhagavathar, Mridangam Narayanaswamy Appa, Mridangam Azhaga Nambi Pillai, Kumbakonam Sivakolundu and Tirumarugal Natesa Nayakarar were his contemporaries and used to accompany him in his concerts.

Death 
Sri Sarabha Sastrigal died at the young age of 32 years in the year 1904 at Kumbakonam. Sarabha Shastri, like many a great genius, lived only a short life. Upon his death at the age of 32, his work was carried on by his most celebrated disciple, Palladam Sanjeeva Rao, who perfected and elaborated on the fingering system and popularised the flute as a solo concert instrument. However the original contribution of Sarabha Shastri upgrading the flute onto the concert platform remains immortal

Sastri’s Flute 
The flute he handled is still on display at Sri Rama Bhajanai Sabha at 110, Solaippan Street, Kumbakonam. Sri Sarabha Sastrigal's flute has been preserved for more than 100 years by Sastri's family members.

Venuganam Sri Sarabha Sastrigal Memorial Trust 
A trust under the name and style of "Venuganam Sri Sarabha Sastrigal Memorial Trust" has been formed and functioning, organising music, cultural and service-oriented programs, and the trust is managed by leading personalities. Ekadasi Bhajans and Radha Kalyanam are conducted fortnightly, during the month of Margazhi.

Sri Rama Bhajanai Sabha 
Sastri lived a very simple life and offered his divine music as worship to Lord Rama. Sri Rama Navami uthsavam was performed by him every year which used to be attended by all the leading musicians of those days. This tradition is continued until today by group of enthusiasts.

Sri Rama Bhajanai Sabha, Kumbakonam founded and nurtured by the famous Venuganam Sri Sarabha Sastrigal about 125 years ago occupies a unique place among various cultural and service organisations. Sri Rama Bhajanai Sabha, Kumbakonam remains committed to its vision of being the premier Sabha that serves the cultural and religious needs of the Hindu society of current and future generations and be the hub of vibrant culture and service-oriented programs. With the grace of lord Sri Rama, the sabha is progressing towards this vision by celebrating Sri Rama Navami Utasavams, Sri Radha Kalyana Mahotsavam every year, Sri Kanchi Kamakoti peetam Maha Periyava Jayanthi, Bhajans on every Ekadasi days, organising lectures on Srimath Valmiki Ramayana, Bhagavadham etc. and offering community services including Annadhanams during festivals.(Ramabhajanaisabha blogspot link in the reference section contains all articles published about Sarabha Sastrigal since 1904)

References

1872 births
1904 deaths
Indian flautists
Venu players
20th-century Indian male classical singers
Indian male classical musicians
Blind musicians
19th-century Indian male classical singers
20th-century flautists